Double Arrow or Double arrow may refer to:

 a subset of arrows in Unicode
 the British Rail Double Arrow logo, now officially known as the National Rail Double Arrow
 the Double Arrow Lodge, near Seeley Lake in the US state of Montana